Ariosoma megalops is an eel in the family Congridae (conger/garden eels). It was described by Henry Weed Fowler in 1938. It is a tropical, marine eel which is known from the western central Pacific Ocean. It is known to dwell at a maximum depth of 717 metres. Males can reach a maximum standard length of 14.9 centimetres.

References

megalops
Taxa named by Henry Weed Fowler
Fish described in 1938